Varban Kilifarski was born in Harsovo, Bulgaria in 1879. He studied at the gymnasium in Razgrad. Of bourgeois origin, he discovered very young the anarchistic ideas. In 1893 he started his revolutionary activities as a member of a Macedonian Secret Revolutionary Committee. Later Kilifarski became a member of the Internal Macedonian Revolutionary Organization and a friend with Gotse Delchev. In 1907, together with Michail Gerdjikov, he founded the first periodic anarchistic newspaper in Bulgaria. In 1912 he moved to France and influenced by the experiments of Francisco Ferrer's Modern School, Kilifarski went back to Bulgaria and began constructing his own school, which had to be aborted when the Balkan war broke out in 1912. Antimilitarist, he marched to Switzerland, later to Paris, where he exerted like professor in “The Ruche”, of Sébastien Faure. With the declaration of the First World War in 1914, Kilifarski moved to Italy (part of the time under house arrest), returning to Bulgaria after the conflict ended. Kilifarski died in 1923 after a brief illness.

Sources

1879 births
1920 deaths
Bulgarian anarchists
Bulgarian revolutionaries
Members of the Internal Macedonian Revolutionary Organization
People from Razgrad Province